The Order of the Resistance 1940–1944 is a civil decoration of the Luxembourg. Established by Charlotte, Grand Duchess of Luxembourg by decree on March 30, 1946, the order recognizes civilians who, in the German occupation of Luxembourg during World War II, distinguished themselves particularly in the service of the national or allied cause, or by brilliant acts of resistance, courage, and dedication. Those recognized could be awarded a cross or a medal by the monarch of Luxembourg with the recommendation of the Prime Minister and the Council for the Remembrance of the Resistance. In 2003, it was determined that the cross could only be awarded posthumously and the medal would no longer be awarded.

References

External links

Civil awards and decorations of Luxembourg